The Bergisches Land (Berg Country) is a low mountain range in the state of North Rhine-Westphalia, Germany, east of the Rhine and south of the Ruhr. The landscape is shaped by woods, meadows, rivers and creeks and contains over twenty artificial lakes. Wuppertal is the biggest town, while the southern part has economic and socio-cultural ties to Cologne. Wuppertal and the neighbouring cities of Remscheid and Solingen form the Bergisches Städtedreieck.

History 
Bergisches Land used to be territory of the County of Berg, which later became the Duchy of Berg, who gave the region its name. The Duchy was dissolved in 1815 and in 1822 the region became part of the Prussian Rhine Province.

Amongst the population today, a sense of belonging to the region Bergisches Land is notable in the hilly northern part, but not so much anymore in the areas near the Cologne Bight, the Ruhr area or the city of Düsseldorf.

Economic upswing 
The region became famous during the period of its early industrialisation in the 19th century. At that time Wupper Valley was a historical Silicon Valley. Its twin cities Barmen and Elberfeld were the trading- and industrial capitals of Prussia at that time. This economic upswing caused the expansion of the Ruhrgebiet as coal-mining area and gave birth to research on, and the theoretical underlining of social entrepreneurship and socialism: Friedrich Engels was born in Barmen to a textile mill owner.

After the industrial downturn from the 1960s on, the region lost importance but cooperations by Bergisches Land entrepreneurs, active citizens and politicians are bringing back some regional awareness and economic power.

Cities and districts

See also 
 
 
 Bergische Museumsbahnen
 Bergisch-Märkische Railway Company 
 Rhineland
 Berg house

References

External links 
  www.bergisches-land.de by Bergisches Land Tourismus Marketing e.V 

 
Mountain ranges of North Rhine-Westphalia
Regions of North Rhine-Westphalia
Rhenish Massif
Cultural landscapes of North Rhine-Westphalia